Jakić is a South Slavic surname. Notable people with the surname include:

 Kristijan Jakić (born 1997), Croatian footballer
 Tomislav Jakić (born 1943), Croatian journalist
 Vojislav Jakić (1932–2003), Serbian painter

See also
Yakich
 Jakič

Croatian surnames
Serbian surnames